Wang Donglei (Simplified Chinese: 王冬雷) (1 January 1985 – 5 April 2008) was a Chinese footballer. He played for Nanjing Yoyo in Chinese Jia League. 

Wang Donglei was only 23 years old when he died in a car accident on the night of 5 April 2008. He is the first footballer to have died during his playing career in the Chinese professional football league.

References

1985 births
2008 deaths
Road incident deaths in the People's Republic of China
Chinese footballers
Footballers from Liaoning
Nanjing Yoyo players
Association football midfielders